Tub was a unit of capacity or of weight used in Britain and elsewhere.

British unit for butter and cheese
British laws for the sale of goods defined a tub of butter as a receptacle of a size which could contain 84 pounds of butter.

Definition 

1 tub of butter or cheese = 84 pounds

Conversion 

1 tub = 1.5 Firkin (1 Firkin = 56 lbs)

Metric equivalent 
1 tub =

Other commodities
The Oxford English Dictionary has quotations illustrating other values of a "tub" as a unit:
Tea (1706): "about 60 pounds"
"Camphire" (1706): "from 56 to 86 pounds"
Vermilion (1706): "3 to 4 hundred weight" (i.e. 336-448 pounds)
Camphor (1858): "130 Dutch lbs"

In Newfoundland, Canada, a tub of coal was defined as 100 pounds, while a tub of herrings was 16 Imperial gallons and a tub of salt was 18 Imperial gallons.

References

Units of mass
Customary units of measurement